The 2016–17 NBB Cup was the 49th edition of the Netherlands' national basketball cup tournament. Donar won its fifth national cup title.

Format
In the first, second and third round teams from the Dutch second, third and fourth division participate. From the fourth round, teams from the Dutch Basketball League (DBL) enter the competition. Quarter- and semi-finals are played in a two-legged format. When a team form a tier lower than the DBL played a DBL team, one win is sufficient for the latter to advance to the next round.

Bracket

Final

References

NBB Cup
NBB Cup